Scrobipalpa suasella is a moth in the family Gelechiidae. It was described by Constant in 1895. It is found in southern France, Portugal, and Spain, as well as on Sardinia.

The larvae feed on Staehelina dubia. They mine the leaves of their host plant. The mine has the form of a large, full depth blotch with dispersed frass.

References

Scrobipalpa
Moths described in 1895